Beckstar Sangma was an Indian politician and member of the Nationalist Congress Party. Sangma was a member of the Meghalaya Legislative Assembly from the Rongchugiri constituency in West Garo Hills district as Indian National Congress candidate in 1993 and 1998.

References 

People from West Garo Hills district
Nationalist Congress Party politicians from Meghalaya
1950 births
2008 deaths
Meghalaya politicians
21st-century Indian politicians
Meghalaya MLAs 1993–1998
Meghalaya MLAs 1998–2003
Garo people